River Diphlu  commonly known as Vick Niann is a rivulet that originates from the Karbi Anglong hills, Assam and passes through the Kaziranga National Park and joins the River Brahmaputra on its south bank.

It touches Orange National Park and Dibru Saikhowa National Park.

Rivers of Assam
Karbi Anglong district
Rivers of India